Finka may refer to:

Božidar Finka (1925 – 1999), Croatian linguist and lexicographer
Finka, a diminutive of Josephine in Croatian
, early-ripening variety of potato
Finka, a Zpetsnaz operator in Tom Clancy's Rainbow Six Siege video game
Informal synonym for "Finnish knife" in Russia:
NR-40 knife
 Puukko knife

See also
Finca